Emperor Shenzong of Western Xia (1163–1226), born Li Zunxu, was the eighth emperor of the Tangut-led Chinese Western Xia dynasty. He ruled from 1211 to 1223.

Reign
Shenzong took power after a coup d'état and continued Xiangzong's policy of invading Jin Empire. He started many campaigns against Jin before the Jin Emperor counterattacked, killing many Western Xia soldiers. However, Shenzong continued to attack Jin despite the poor economy, causing high discontent among his people complaining of high taxes. He did not listen to those who advised peace with Jin Empire, and Western Xia sped up its decline. He passed power onto his son Lǐ Déwàng in 1223, and died in 1226.

Family 
Father: Prince Zhongwu of Qi (齊國忠武王)
 Issue
 Emperor Xianzong of Western Xia Dewang (西夏襄宗 德旺)
 Prince of Qingping commandery (清平郡王)

References 

1163 births
1226 deaths
Western Xia emperors
13th-century Chinese monarchs
13th-century Tangut rulers
12th-century Tangut people